Esko Almgren (born 2 July 1932) is a Finnish high school teacher and politician. He was the chairman of the Christian Democrats between 1982 and 1989. He served at the Finnish Parliament for three terms. He is the honorary chairman of the Christian Democrats.

Early life and education
Almgren was born in Kotka on 2 July 1932. He was the seventh child of his parents. He attended the University of Helsinki and received a degree in geography and biology.

Career
After his graduation Almgren worked as a teacher. In 1964 and 1975 he ran for a seat in the provincial elections for the Conservatives. Almgren became a member of the Christian Democrats in 1976. Then he was named as the secretary general of the party. In 1979 he was elected to the Finnish Parliament. In 1982 Almgren became the chairman of the Christian Democrats and held the post until 1989. He was elected to the Parliament in the 1983 and 1988 elections.

Personal life
Almgren married Kaarina Wahlroos, and they had four children.

References

External links

|-

|-

20th-century Finnish educators
1932 births
Christian Democrats (Finland) politicians
Leaders of political parties in Finland
Living people
Members of the Parliament of Finland (1979–83)
Members of the Parliament of Finland (1983–87)
Members of the Parliament of Finland (1987–91)
People from Kotka
University of Helsinki alumni